Graboszyce  is a village in the administrative district of Gmina Zator, within Oświęcim County, Lesser Poland Voivodeship, in southern Poland.

The village has an approximate population of 750.

References

Graboszyce